María Santos Induráin Orduna (born 1959) is a Navarrese politician, Minister of Health of Navarre since August 2019.

References

1959 births
Government ministers of Navarre
Living people
Politicians from Navarre